Hell Comes to Frogtown is a 1988 American science fiction action film co-directed by Donald G. Jackson and R. J. Kizer, and written by Jackson and Randall Frakes. The film stars professional wrestler Roddy Piper as well as Sandahl Bergman, Cec Verrell, William Smith and Rory Calhoun.

Plot
This film is set in a post-apocalyptic wasteland where few fertile men and women exist due to atomic fallout. As a result, the government places a high priority on those who can still breed. Shortly before the movie opens, a group of mutant amphibians (who have been exiled to the desert by humans) capture a group of fertile women and are using them as sex slaves.

Sam Hell (Piper) is a nomadic traveler who wanders the countryside. He is first seen tied to a chair and smashed over the head with a bottle by a man whose daughter he sexually assaulted. He is eventually captured by an organization of warrior-nurses, the closest thing to a government in his region of the world, who reveal that they located him by tracking the trail of pregnant women left in his wake. Their original plan was to use him as breeding stock with their collection of fertile women, but this was the group captured by the mutants. With their own attempts to capture the women failing, the group presses Hell into service as a mercenary; he is to infiltrate the mutant city (derogatorily referred to as "Frogtown") and rescue the women. To make sure that the rebellious Hell follows his orders, he is forced to wear an electronic protective codpiece that will explode if he disobeys or tries to abort his mission. Having already had numerous samples of his reproductive material taken, he is now deemed far more expendable than the women themselves. To aid him in his mission (and make sure he follows the plan), he is paired with one of the nurses, Spangle (Bergman), and an aggressive guard named Centinella (Verrell).

During their journey to Frogtown, Hell tries numerous times to escape, but quickly learns that a device Spangle carries will shock his genitals if used or if he gets too far away from it. Despite their rocky start and Spangle's initial cold demeanor, the pair grow closer during the journey and eventually fall in love. When they reach Frogtown, everyone involved is captured. The frogs' second-in-command, Bull (Nicholas Worth), tortures Hell and attempts to remove the codpiece for its technology. Meanwhile, a slightly drugged Spangle is forced to work as a slave and dance for the frogs' Commander Toty (Brian Frank) in the notable "Dance of the Three Snakes" sequence. Proving more successful than she had wished, the nurse soon finds herself at the mercy of the aroused commander. However, with the codpiece now removed (Bull finally removed it with a chainsaw, but it blew up and killed him), the escaped Hell rescues her along with the group of fertile women (Ellen Crocker, Kim Hewson, Ilana Ishaki, Annie McKinon and Janie Thorson) held captive.

Cast 

 Roddy Piper, as Sam Hell, a man who lost his daughter in the nuclear war that precedes this movie and hooks up with women very frequently after the disaster. He is the main protagonist in this film and is tasked with saving a group of girls from the frog leader Toty (Brian Franks). He changes a lot throughout the film, starting off as an immature man who wants to just keep hooking up with women, to finally a man who finds a true love who will have to be okay with him impregnating several other girls for the good of the world.  
 Sandahl Bergman as Spangle, a government scientist that is tasked with taking care of and making sure that Sam successfully rescues the girls and does his job of impregnating them to repopulate the world. To do this she has the controls to a device on Sam's groin area that lets her inflict pain in that area whenever she chooses with her earrings.
 Cec Verrell as Centinella, a quiet but fierce military guard escort to Spangle (Sandahl Bergman) and Sam (Roddy Piper). She mainly wields a light machine gun from the top of the car they are traveling in, however, she proves to be versatile in her arms when she uses other weapons. Centinella is one of the first women we see attempting to seduce Sam, finding out if the "rumors" are true however is cut short by Spangle exiting the tent and getting angry at them.  
 William Smith as Captain Devlin / Count Sodom, is also a military personnel, he first runs into Sam when they capture him and we see Devlin interrogating him about sleeping with his daughter to which he hears from another lady she became pregnant from Sam. He plays a big role in the beginning and end of the movie when we learn that he is dealing arms to the frog people under the disguise as Count Sodom. His plan is to use all the nuclear energy to help in his master plan of ridding all the female leaders/power which he believes is becoming a problem in the world.
 Rory Calhoun as Looney Tunes, a crazy old miner whom Sam knew had known before. Looney first makes his appearance in a bar in Frogtown where he tells Sam his reason for being there which is to mine uranium to eventually sell to the frog people. He helps play a part in saving Sam from the frog people by distracting them with flares. He later escapes with the party, but is killed while on the road.
 Nicholas Worth as Bull, a frogtown chief. Power hungry with a strong dislike of humans, he inflicts pain whenever he can on people.  Bull shows that side of himself well when he begins his plot to torture Sam. When however he first decides to remove the government device around Sam's groin, he is killed by the implanted explosive. 
 Kristi Somers as Arabella, a female frog mutant and ally of Sam.
 Brian Frank as Commander Toty, the Frogtown chief.  His goal in the movie is to have a group of girls that can make his "three snakes" rise.
 Julius LeFlore as Squidlips, is a character seen at the very beginning of the movie shooting a man as they rummage for valuables.
 Eyde Byrde as Patton, a woman that works in the hospital that treats Sam and puts on the government device. Patton ultimately messes over Sam by having him sign away his rights.
 Lee Garlington as Briefing Officer, is the one tasked with briefing Sam on what he is now to deal with throughout the rest of the movie.

Reception
Critical reception for Hell Comes to Frogtown has been mixed to positive. TV Guide awarded the film two out of five stars, calling it "Another of those futuristic, post-apocalyptic science fiction dramas".

DVD Talk gave the film three out of five stars, writing, "Rowdy Roddy Piper has to save the world by diddling beautiful babes and squashing six-foot mutant toads with crummy attitudes. What's not to like?"

Jason Cook from The Spinning Image rated the film a score of six out of ten stars, writing, "Cheap and cheerful its narrative lulls and directorial shortcomings are glossed over by a winning central performance and a smattering of witty dialogue. Its no cinematic masterpiece, but were there any talking mutant frogs in Citizen Kane?"

Creature Feature gave the movie 2.5 stars, finding that while it is a Mad Max ripoff, it does so with a sense of style and has the ability to laugh at itself.

Though not received well by critics, producer Randall Frakes says he was glad the fans seemed to like it and "get all the jokes as intended".

Legacy

Hell Comes to Frogtown inspired the title of the "Hell Comes to Quahog" (2006) episode of animated television series Family Guy.

Hell Comes to Frogtown still makes an appearance in today's news sources being compared to Roller Blade Warriors.

Sequels and spinoffs
Hell Comes to Frogtown spawned one sequel, Return to Frogtown, which was released directly to VHS in 1993.

Toad Warrior was released in 1996 and later re-released as Max Hell Frog Warrior in 2002. According to Jackson, the film was intended as a stand-alone story.

References

External links 
 
 
 
 
 

1980s science fiction action films
1988 films
American disaster films
American post-apocalyptic films
American satirical films
American science fiction action films
New World Pictures films
1980s English-language films
Films directed by Donald G. Jackson
1980s American films